The 1958 Soviet Chess Championship was the 25th edition of USSR Chess Championship, held from 12 January to 14 February 1958 in Riga. The tournament was won by Mikhail Tal. The final was preceded by quarterfinals events at Tbilisi (won by Mark Taimanov, 16½ points in 19 games), Minsk (Aivar Gipslis, 14½/19) and Ashkhabad (A. Miroshnichenko, 13½/19); semifinals at Leningrad (Boris Spassky, 12½/19), Sverdlovsk (Viktor Korchnoi, 13½/19) and Kiev (Tigran Petrosian, 12½/19).

Table and results

Semifinals

Final
The semifinals qualifiers joined Tal and Bronstein (who entered the final directly by ranking criteria of the Soviet Federation) to play the final in Riga.

References 

USSR Chess Championships
Championship
Chess
1958 in chess
Chess